The Passional of Abbess Kunigunde is an illuminated Latin manuscript commissioned by Prague Benedictine Abbess Kunigunde of Bohemia, daughter of King Ottokar II of Bohemia, after 1312. The work is an anthology of mystic treatises on the theme of Christ‘s passion, two of them were composed by Czech Dominican friar Kolda of Koldice. The manuscript was written and maybe also illuminated by Prague canon Beneš, who served as a priest in the St. George's Convent.

The earliest surviving coloured depiction of the heraldic emblem of Bohemia (today the Lesser coat of arms of the Czech Republic) can be found in the manuscript.

Gallery

Notes

References

External links

 Facsimile

National Library of the Czech Republic
14th-century illuminated manuscripts
Czech manuscripts